John Leamy (born 1964) is an Irish retired hurler. His league and championship career with the Tipperary senior team in the late eighties and early nineties saw him winning 2 Munster Senior Medals and 1 All Ireland. 

Leamy first appeared for the Golden–Kilfeacle club at juvenile and underage levels, before eventually joining the club's adult team. After winning five divisional intermediate championship medals, he won a county intermediate championship medal in 1995.

Leamy made his debut on the inter-county scene when he was selected for the Tipperary minor team. He enjoyed two championship seasons with the minor team, culminating with the winning of an All-Ireland medal in 1982. Leamy subsequently joined the under-21 team, winning an All-Ireland medal in 1985 while also playing for the county junior team. He joined the senior team during the 1988 championship. Over the course of the next number of seasons Leamy was the second-choice goalkeeper and won an All-Ireland medal as a substitute in 1989. He also won two Munster medals. Leamy ended his inter-county career with the Tipperary intermediate team in 1995.

Honours

Team

Golden–Kilfeacle
Tipperary Intermediate Hurling Championship (1): 1995

Tipperary
All-Ireland Senior Hurling Championship (1): 1989
Munster Senior Hurling Championship (3): 1987, 1988, 1989
All-Ireland Under-21 Hurling Championship (1): 1985
Munster Under-21 Hurling Championship (2): 1984, 1985
All-Ireland Minor Hurling Championship (1): 1982
Munster Minor Hurling Championship (1): 1982
 All-Ireland Intermediate Hurling Championship (1): 1991
 1991

References

1964 births
Living people
Golden-Kilfeacle hurlers
Tipperary inter-county hurlers
Hurling goalkeepers